The Petit Jean River Bridge was a historic bridge in rural northeastern Yell County, Arkansas. It is located north of Ola, and carries County Road 49 across the Petit Jean River. The trusses rest on concrete pillars. Built in 1930, it was one of three Pratt truss bridges in the county. On February 1, 2019, the bridge was destroyed by an undertrained trucker who was unable to comprehend the clearly marked weight limits of the structure (15 tons)

The bridge was listed on the National Register of Historic Places in 2010, and was delisted in 2019.

See also
Petit Jean River Bridge (Logan County, Arkansas)
National Register of Historic Places listings in Yell County, Arkansas
List of bridges on the National Register of Historic Places in Arkansas

References

Road bridges on the National Register of Historic Places in Arkansas
National Register of Historic Places in Yell County, Arkansas
Bridges completed in 1930
Pratt truss bridges in the United States
Metal bridges in the United States
Former National Register of Historic Places in Arkansas
1930 establishments in Arkansas
Transportation in Yell County, Arkansas
2019 disestablishments in Arkansas
Demolished buildings and structures in Arkansas